Fantastic Four is a fictional superhero team appearing in American comic books published by Marvel Comics.

Fantastic Four may also refer to:

Comics
 Fantastic Four (comic book)
 Fantastic Four Adventures, the Panini Comics comic that reprints Fantastic Four comics for the UK
 Ultimate Fantastic Four, the Ultimate Marvel comic book variation on the classic team

Film
 Fantastic Four (2005 film), a 2005 film based on the Marvel Comics series, directed by Tim Story
 Fantastic Four: Rise of the Silver Surfer, a 2007 sequel to the 2005 film, also directed by Tim Story
 Fantastic Four (2015 film), a 2015 reboot, directed by Josh Trank
 Fantastic Four (2025 film), an upcoming film in the Marvel Cinematic Universe
 The Fantastic Four (unreleased film), an unreleased film by Roger Corman completed in 1994, also based on the comics

Television
 Fantastic Four (1967 TV series), a 1967 animated series based on the comics
 The New Fantastic Four, a 1978 animated series based on the comics, notable for not including The Human Torch
 Fantastic Four (1994 TV series), a 1994 animated series as part of The Marvel Action Hour, also based on the comics
 Fantastic Four: World's Greatest Heroes (2006 TV Series), also based on the comics

Music
 The Fantastic Four (band), an R&B vocal group that recorded for the Motown and Westbound labels, among others, during the 1960s and 70s

Video games
 Fantastic Four (1997 video game), a PlayStation video game based on the comics
 Fantastic Four (2005 video game), from Activision, based on the 2005 film

See also
 Die Fantastischen Vier, a German hip hop group
 Golden State Warriors, a basketball team based in Oakland